LOUD Audio, LLC is a professional audio company based in the United States, operating in the U.S., Canada, and Shenzhen, China. Originally founded as Mackie Designs, Inc., the name was changed to Loud Technologies Inc in 2003 to differentiate its founding subsidiary, mixing console manufacturer Mackie from its eponymous brand name.

Between 2003 and 2018, LOUD Technologies owned or distributed several music instrument and pro audio product brands that it had acquired over the years. Transom Capital Group acquired the company in October 2017, renaming it LOUD Audio, LLC and within 12 months had divested itself of brands Ampeg, Martin Audio and EAW, leaving Mackie as the sole surviving subsidiary.

History

Origin
Greg Mackie founded Mackie Designs, Inc. in 1988, following the success of his first two professional audio equipment companies, TAPCO and AudioControl. Focused on the goal of producing a reasonably-priced high-quality mixer, he produced the company's first product, the LM-1602, in his three bedroom condominium in Edmonds, Washington.

Early growth
Mackie Designs, Inc. experienced tremendous growth over the next four years, with sales growing from $3.8 million to over $64 million. This success began with moving production to a proper factory for their second product, the CR-1604 mixer. The CR-1604's feature set, performance, and competitive price was an ideal fit for a wide range of applications, resulting in hundreds of thousands of units sold over the course of the next five years,
and accounting for over 48% of Mackie's overall revenues at that time.

The company's ongoing growth of more than 100 percent annually necessitated relocating and expanding manufacturing every year. By 1994, the company had grown into a 30,000 square-foot factory. The following year, as they celebrated the sale of the 100,000th Mackie mixer, the company moved into an even larger 90,000 square-foot factory and invested in automated assembly machines to achieve high productivity and quality with lower overall production costs. With just 8 products (all mixers), Mackie Designs, Inc. completed an initial public stock offering

Diversification and acquisitions
At the July 1996 NAMM Show, Mackie Designs product introductions marked its first entry into power amps, and active studio monitors, while also expanding into higher-end, large-format mixing consoles. The following year marked the introduction of the Digital 8-Bus Recording Console - the company's first digital product, and the Human User Interface (HUI) control surface, co-developed with Digidesign for Pro Tools.

From 1998-2000 the company began expanding beyond the Mackie brand, acquiring Radio Cine Forniture S.p.A. (RCF) in 1998 and leveraging RCF technologies to develop Mackie's first powered loudspeaker, the SRM450, the following year. In 2000 the company acquired well-established commercial sound reinforcement system manufacturer Eastern Acoustic Works (EAW). By 2001, loudspeakers accounted for 55% of the company's total revenues.

In 2000, Mackie Designs completed the purchase of Acuma Labs for an undisclosed sum. Acuma had been contracted by Mackie Designs for its services for several years before being acquired for its technology and scientists.

In 2001, the company entered the professional audio production market with the purchase of Sydec, and created the Mackie Broadcast Professional line of products.

Behringer lawsuit
Mackie Designs sued  Behringer GmbH on June 18, 1997 alleging "trademark and trade dress infringement, copyright and patent infringement, and unfair competitive practices by two U.S. entities, a German company, their chief executive officers and others. The lawsuit sought $109 million USD in actual damages up to $327 million USD in total damages under the law.

By 1999, lawsuit had been dismissed in Behringer's favour noting that "Mackie's circuit board designs were not covered by the U.S. copyright office".

Mackie's lawsuit against Behringer UK similarly failed with Justice Pumfrey concluding "citizens of the United States of America are not entitled to design right under the CDPA unless habitually resident in the European Union or one of the comparatively limited list of qualifying countries".

Equity investment and rebranding
In February 2003 after declining sales and 7 consecutive quarters of per-share losses, Sun Capital Partners acquired 65% of the company, and subsequently delisted from NASDAQ. Greg Mackie left the board, remaining only in a consulting role.

Six months later, in July 2003, the company issued layoff warnings to 200 manufacturing employees and planned to outsource manufacturing of key products.

In September 2003 the parent company was rebranded as LOUD Technologies, Inc. to avoid confusion between the parent company and the Mackie brand.

Further acquisitions and divestments
In December, 2003, LOUD divested itself from its Italian operations, including RCF.

In March 2005, LOUD acquired St. Louis Music, including Ampeg, Crate Amplifiers, Alvarez Guitars, and Knilling orchestral string instruments, and continued St Louis Music operations as an indirect wholly owned subsidiary. In March 2007, LOUD acquired Martin Audio.

In November 2008, U.S. Band and Orchestra Supplies Inc. acquired St. Louis Music (SLM) and Knilling from LOUD, with LOUD retained ownership of Alvarez, Ampeg, and Crate. The following year, SLM entered into an agreement with LOUD to exclusively sell and market Alvarez Guitars.

Ownership change and renewed focus
In October 2017, Transom Capital Group acquired all LOUD Technologies brands and rebranded the company as LOUD Audio, LLC. At the time of the announcement, Transom had promised to invest and grow each of the brands but the following year, Transom completed three divestments to focus exclusively on its core Mackie brand, selling Ampeg to Yamaha Guitar Group, Inc. in May, Martin Audio to Lloyds Development Capital in July, and EAW to the RCF Group in September of that year.

In 2019, LOUD Audio announced that Mark Ureda had joined its board of directors after recently retiring as SVP at Harman Professional.

Move from Woodinville to Bothell
At its peak, LOUD Audio operated out of two side-by-side buildings in Woodinville, Washington: Mackie Designs I (89,147 RSF) and Mackie Designs II (81,250 RSF) housing all company operations. With the inevitable shift of manufacturing from USA to Mexico to China and the sale of several of its brands, LOUD downsized its US operations and relocated to Bothell, Washington in 2019.

Past leadership
 Jamie Engen, former CEO (2003 - 2008)
 Rodney Olson, former CEO (Aug 2008 - 2010)
 Mark Graham, former CEO (Oct 2010 - 2018)
 Ty Schultz, former Managing Partner, Transom Capital Group (2015 - June 2021)
 Ralph Quintero, former VP of Sales and Marketing (Feb 2020 - Dec 2021)

Current leadership
 Alex Nelson, CEO (Aug 2020–present), former Mackie President and General Manager (2006 - 2020)
 Danny Olesh, CTO (Mar 2021–present)
 Mark Ureda, Director (Jan 2019–present)

Brands

Current
 Mackie

Former
 Alvarez Guitar
 Ampeg
 Austin Guitar
 CRATE Audio
 EAW
 EAW Commercial
 Knilling Instruments
 Mackie Broadcast
 Martin Audio
 Rhythm Art
 RCF
 SIA Software
 SLM Marketplace
 Tracktion

Defunct
 Blackheart
 Crate Amplifiers
 TAPCO (by Mackie)

References

External links 
 

1988 establishments in Washington (state)
American companies established in 1988
Electronics companies disestablished in 1988
Companies traded over-the-counter in the United States
Manufacturers of professional audio equipment
Companies based in Woodinville, Washington
Audio equipment manufacturers of the United States
2003 mergers and acquisitions
2017 mergers and acquisitions